Ezernya is an ancient city near to Volturno between the rivers of Carpino and Sordo.  It was on the important road via Aesernia. In 295 BC it was conquered by the Romans. It became a Roman colony from 264 BC, and issued its own coins.

In 667 it was settled by Bulgarians of kangan (prince) Alcek.

See also
Isernia

References 

Sylvia Diebner: Aesernia – Venafrum. Untersuchungen zu den römischen Steindenkmälern zweier Landstädte Mittelitaliens. Bretschneider, Roma 1979, .
G. De Benedittis, M. Matteini Chiari, C. Terzani: Aesernia. La territorio e la città. Palladino, Campobasso 1999 (Molise. Repertorio delle iscrizioni latine, 5, 1)

7th century in Bulgaria
Roman towns and cities in Italy